The following is a list of notable people born in Värnamo and nearby villages.

A 
Agnes Alexiusson, boxer
Ellen Allgurin, tennis player
Johan Andersson, footballer
Anna Anvegård, footballer

B 
Alice Bah Kuhnke, Member of the European Parliament

Ulla Billquist, schlager singer

C 
Pär Cederqvist, footballer
Martin Claesson, footballer
Viktor Claesson, footballer

E 
Josef Elvby, footballer
Tobias Englund, footballer

G 
Lars Gustafsson, wrestler

H 
Signe Hebbe,  operatic soprano and instructor
Carl-Axel Heiknert, actor
Niklas Hult, footballer

I 
Stefan Ingvarsson, racewalker

J 
Ville Jansson, tennis player
Alexander Johansson, ice hockey player
Hans-Göran Johansson, mayor of Värnamo Municipality and father of Annie Lööf
Per Johansson, footballer
Sven Johansson, sport shooter

L 
Allan Larsson, politician
Björn Lekman, speed skater
John Ljunggren, Olympic gold medalist in racewalking
Alexander Lundh, motorcycle racer
Annie Lööf, leader of the Centre Party

M 
Bruno Mathsson, furniture designer

N 
Jesper Nelin, biathlete and Olympic gold medalist
Torsten Nothin, former Minister for Justice and Governor of Stockholm
Patrik Näslund, ice hockey player

O 
Mats Odell, politician
Sven Ohlsson, wrestler
Hanna Ouchterlony, creator of the Swedish Salvation Army

R 
Elbasan Rashani, footballer
Felix Rosenqvist, racing driver

Elize Ryd, singer-songwriter and member of the band Amaranthe

S 
Loret Sadiku, footballer
Stig Sjölin, Olympic boxer
Allan Svensson, actor
Eva-Britt Svensson, former Member of the European Parliament
Michael Svensson, footballer
Freddy Söderberg, footballer

T 
Mattias Tedenby, ice hockey player
Anna Tenje, minister for social security
Jonas Thern, football manager and former professional player
Simon Thern, footballer
Theresa Traore Dahlberg, film director and screenwriter

Ö 
Bernt Östh, former Swedish Armed Forces officer

See also 

 :Category:People from Värnamo Municipality

Värnamo